Bevan Barry John Griggs (born 29 March 1978) is a New Zealand cricketer who played for Central Districts. In his 83 first-class cricket matches he has taken 245 dismissals for Central Districts, a CD record.  Bevan also plays for United cricket club in Palmerston North. He was born in Palmerston North. He scored 3155 runs from 130 innings of 83 matches.

External links
 

1979 births
Living people
Cricketers from Palmerston North
New Zealand cricketers
Central Districts cricketers
People educated at Palmerston North Boys' High School
Wicket-keepers